The 1902 Chicago Orphans season was the 31st season of the Chicago Orphans franchise, the 27th in the National League and the 10th at West Side Park. The Orphans finished fifth in the National League with a record of 68–69.

Regular season

Season standings

Record vs. opponents

Roster

Player stats

Batting

Starters by position 
Note: Pos = Position; G = Games played; AB = At bats; H = Hits; Avg. = Batting average; HR = Home runs; RBI = Runs batted in

Other batters 
Note: G = Games played; AB = At bats; H = Hits; Avg. = Batting average; HR = Home runs; RBI = Runs batted in

Pitching

Starting pitchers 
Note: G = Games pitched; IP = Innings pitched; W = Wins; L = Losses; ERA = Earned run average; SO = Strikeouts

External links
1902 Chicago Orphans season at Baseball Reference

Chicago Cubs seasons
Chicago Orphans season
Chicago Cubs